Mallplaza is a Chilean chain of malls operated in South America by Falabella.

History
There are 11 locations in Chile, 4 in Peru (under the Mall Aventura Plaza brand until 2016), and 3 in Colombia. They are large regional shopping malls anchored by multiple department stores and hypermarkets. This includes the parent company's Falabella department stores and Tottus hypermarkets . The company's mottos are "Hay vida en tu plaza" - "There's life in your plaza", "Más vida a tu vida" - "More life to your life", and "Dale vida a tu plaza" - "Give life to your plaza. Falabella plans on opening 40 new locations within 2011 including expansion in Peru and into Colombia and Argentina. In September 2017, Falabella launched its 45th store in the Mallplaza.

Notes

External links

Mall Plaza website

Retail companies of Chile
Falabella (retail store)
Retail companies established in 1990
1990 establishments in Chile
Shopping malls in Chile
Shopping malls in Peru
Companies based in Santiago
Companies listed on the Santiago Stock Exchange